The Cathedral of the Blessed Sacrament is a Roman Catholic cathedral located at One Cathedral Square in Altoona, Pennsylvania.  It is within the boundaries of the Downtown Altoona Historic District, and was added to the National Register of Historic Places in 1992. It is the mother church of the Diocese of Altoona-Johnstown and is the seat of its bishop, the Most Reverend Mark Leonard Bartchak. The Cathedral of the Blessed Sacrament Pastor is Rev. Monsignor Stanley B. Carson, Administrator.

History

The first Mass in Altoona was celebrated by the Reverend John Walsh, pastor of St. Mary Church in Hollidaysburg, Pennsylvania.  Although it is not known for certain, it was probably in 1850.  The first church in town, St. John the Evangelist, was dedicated the following year. The first resident pastor was the Reverend John Tuigg, who was assigned by Bishop Michael O'Connor of the Diocese of Pittsburgh in 1853. When the Diocese of Altoona was established in 1901, St. John's Church became the pro-cathedral.

It was during the pastorate of the Reverend Morgan Sheedy that the present cathedral was begun. St. John's Pro-Cathedral was torn down to make room for the new building, and a temporary hall was built on Twelfth Avenue to serve as a place of worship. Philadelphia architect George I. Lovatt, Sr., who also designed the Cathedral of St. Patrick in Harrisburg, was chosen to design the new cathedral. Local contractor Alfred D. Reid constructed the building. The three-story rectory was built at the same time, and it is attached to the cathedral by a hyphen.

Ground for the present cathedral was broken on September 17, 1924, and the cornerstone was laid on May 30, 1926. That date was the 25th anniversary of the erection of Diocese of Altoona. Construction came to a halt in 1929 due to the Stock Market Crash.
Construction resumed and the unfinished cathedral was opened for public worship on September 7, 1931. The interior remained incomplete with walls of bare brick and rough concrete surrounding worshipers. Over the next 28 years Bishop Richard Guilfoyle, the third bishop of the diocese, accumulated the funds for the cathedral's completion.  However, he died before work could begin. Guilfoyle's successor, Bishop Howard Carroll, began the work but died within a year. Work had progressed so fast, however, that his funeral was celebrated in March 1960 in the nearly completed cathedral. On November 13, 1960, Bishop J. Carroll McCormick formally opened the cathedral.

Architecture

Exterior
It reflects an academic interpretation of Italy's early Renaissance cathedrals. The dome incorporates elements from those on St. Peter's Basilica in Rome and the Florence Cathedral. It features 24 windows: eight round windows are located at the base, eight dormer windows are on the second tier, and eight eyebrow windows near the top. There is also a skylight at the pinnacle of the dome. Given its location on the peak of Gospel Hill, the cathedral is a visual landmark for the city of Altoona.

Forty-eight stone steps rise in sections along a broad terrace from the street to the main entrance. A Latin phrase is etched onto the stone wall along the staircase: Ecce tabernaculum Dei cum hominibus (Behold the dwelling place of God with men). The main facade features an entrance portico with six Ionic columns in antis. The pedimented portion above it is similar to that of Santa Maria Novella in Florence. The steel and reinforced concrete construction is covered with a veneer of Indiana limestone laid in courses of smooth-faced ashlar.

The main doors into the cathedral are etched glass produced by Baut Studios of Pittsburgh, and they were installed when Monsignor Thomas Madden was pastor/rector (1972-1987). The two center doors portray Jesus at the Last Supper. On the right door he holds the bread and on the other door he holds the cup, that become his body and blood. They are flanked with doors that are etched with the traditional symbols of the four Evangelists: Matthew (angel), Luke (ox), Mark (lion), and John (eagle). On either side of the main facade are statues of two American saints. Saint John Neumann (1811-1860), an immigrant, Bishop of Philadelphia, and the first American male saint is on the left. On the right is Saint Elizabeth Ann Seton (1774-1821), an educator who became the first American-born saint.

Interior

While the exterior follows a more historical vocabulary, the interior is more modern. It was designed by Alfred Reid of Pittsburgh. The baptismal font is placed at the entrance of the cathedral, serving to bring parishioners into the Church metaphorically. The nave is divided into three sections by six large piers. Along the base of the vault of the nave are images of six holy men and women, each of whom has a special connection to the Blessed Sacrament: Saint Tarsicius, Saint Thomas Aquinas, Saint Paschal Baylon, Blessed Juliana of Mount Cornillon, Saint Clare of Assisi, and Blessed Imelda Lambertini.

The dome is located over the crossing. At its base is written Hoc est enim Corpus Meum. Hic est enim Calix Sanguinis Mei. Mysterium Fidei. (This is My Body. This is the Cup of My Blood. The Mystery of Faith.) Along the base of the dome and the sanctuary are also several symbols of the Eucharist: wheat, grapes, wine, loaves of bread, a fish, a monstrance, a chalice and host, and a pelican. Below the dome on the pendentives are medallions of the four Evangelists.

The altar is the central element in the cathedral. It is around the altar that the faithful gather to celebrate Eucharist. Above the altar hangs a golden tester.

The word cathedral is derived from a Latin word, cathedra, meaning "chair". In early Christian literature, it always conveyed the idea of authority. The Cathedral of the Blessed Sacrament, then, is not important simply because it is the largest and the most beautiful church in the diocese, but because of its character as the "cathedra" or "seat" of the bishop.

There are seven sanctuary stained glass windows that consist of The Annunciation, The Nativity, The Last Supper, The Crucifixion, The Resurrection, The Ascension, and The Crowning of Mary. The windows in the cathedral created since 1986 were produced by Hunt Studios in Pittsburgh.

Directly below the altar in the basement, a chapel mausoleum named "the crypt chapel" was erected for the entombment of bishops for the Diocese of Altoona-Johnstown. Currently, six bishops and two rectors of the cathedral are entombed in the crypt chapel, with coat of arms erected on the crypt door: Eugene A. Garvey, John J. McCort, Richard T. Guilfoyle, Howard J. Carroll, J. Carroll McCormick and James J. Hogan. Recent rectors Thomas E. Madden and Paul Panza are also entombed in the chapel.

Pipe organ

The cathedral is home to an organ, built in 1931 by the old German firm of G.F. Steinmeyer and Company, Ottingen, Bavaria, Germany. The organ has 57 speaking stops with 78 ranks and 4,759 pipes, made of wood, zinc and various tin and lead alloys. Four bellows, eight by four feet, each with three folds, furnish the wind supply. Restored in 1992, this historic organ is one of the focal points in the cathedral. In 1997, the organ was featured on "The Joy of Music," with the festival choir, under the direction of Robert Long. The organ stands below the stained glass window of Saint Cecelia, patroness of music and musicians. Mrs. Annie C. Wolf donated the funds for the organ's commissioning and installation.

Pastors
The pastors of the Cathedral of the Blessed Sacrament:
 Rev. John Tuigg, 1853–76
 Rev. John Walsh, 1876–80
 Rev. Thomas Ryan, 1880–83
 Most Rev. John Tuigg, 1883–89
 Administrators: Rev. Nicholas O'Reilly and Rev. Thomas Smith
 Rev. Edward Bush, 1890–94
 Rev. Morgan Sheedy, 1894–1939 (named first Rector in 1901)
 Rev. Msgr. Ildephonse Denny, 1939–72
 Rev. Msgr. Thomas Madden, PA, 1972–87
 Rev. Msgr. Paul Panza, PA, 1987–95
 Rev. Msgr. Robert Mazur, 1995–2019
 Very Rev. Alan Thomas, VG, 2019
 Rev. Msgr. Stanley Carson, 2019–present

See also
St. John Gualbert Cathedral (Johnstown, Pennsylvania)
List of Catholic cathedrals in the United States
List of cathedrals in the United States

References

External links

 Cathedral Website
 Diocese of Altoona-Johnstown Website

Blessed Sacrament (Altoona)
Blessed Sacrament (Altoona))
Buildings and structures in Altoona, Pennsylvania
Roman Catholic churches completed in 1960
Churches in Blair County, Pennsylvania
Church buildings with domes
Historic district contributing properties in Pennsylvania
Renaissance Revival architecture in Pennsylvania
Historic American Buildings Survey in Pennsylvania
National Register of Historic Places in Blair County, Pennsylvania
20th-century Roman Catholic church buildings in the United States